Courson-Monteloup is a commune in the Essonne department in Île-de-France in northern France.

Residents
Inhabitants of Courson-Monteloup are known as Montelupins.

See also
Communes of the Essonne department

References

External links

Mayors of Essonne Association 

Communes of Essonne